Darren Kevin Junee (born 2 July 1969) is an Australian former rugby union and rugby league footballer. He was an Australian rugby union representative and had a first grade rugby league career with the Sydney Roosters in the NSWRFL competition.

Family and early life
Junee is the son of Australian rugby league representative Kevin Junee. He was educated at St. Joseph's College, Hunters Hill from 1981-87 where he played rugby union and featured in the school's first XVs of 1986 and 1987.

Rugby union career
Junee made the Australian schoolboy's rugby union representative side of 1987 and the Australian U21s and the AIS U21s sides in 1988, 1989 and 1990.
His club rugby was with the Eastwood Rugby Club and later the Randwick DRUFC.

He made his Australian representative debut on the Wallabies' 1989 Australia rugby union tour of Canada and France. He made a total of four Test appearances for the Wallabies - two against France, one against Western Samoa and a Bledisloe Cup win against New Zealand. He also made the 1990 Wallaby tour to New Zealand and the 1992 tours of Europe and South Africa and played for Australia in a further 22 tour matches.

From 1990 to 1992 he played in the Australia national rugby sevens team and made toured with that side to hong Kong and Uruguay.

Following his rugby league stint he returned to union in 1998. From 1999 to 2001 he played for the Northern Suburbs Rugby Club in the Shute Shield and the NSW Waratahs in Super Rugby. All told he made 56 appearances for the NSW Waratahs.

Rugby league career
Junee switched to rugby league in 1995 and joined the Sydney City Roosters where his father had played. He was a fullback and utility three-quarter, who made 63 first grade appearances for the club between 1995 and 1998. His league career was hampered by injury and in 1997 he was dropped in favour of the new Roosters arrival Jack Elsegood. He is perhaps best known for a solo, chip and chase try scored for the Roosters in an enthralling victory over the Brisbane Broncos in front of 35,000 people on a Monday night in 1996, that has since gone down in Rugby League folklore.

Professional career
From 2001 to 2018 Junee was a science teacher and boarding house master at St. Joseph's College, Hunters Hill where he coached various sports including rugby. In 2019 he commenced a role as Head of School House at Sydney Church of England Grammar School.

References

 

Australian rugby league players
Australian rugby league coaches
Sydney Roosters players
Australia international rugby union players
People educated at St Joseph's College, Hunters Hill
Living people
1969 births
Rugby union fullbacks